Falls County is a county in the U.S. state of Texas. As of the 2020 census, its population was 16,968. The county seat is Marlin. It is named for the original 10-foot-tall waterfall on the Brazos River, which existed until the river changed course during a storm in 1866.  The present falls is two miles northeast of the original falls, at the Falls on the Brazos Park, a camping site only a few miles out of Marlin on Farm to Market Road 712.

Falls County is part of the Waco, Texas, metropolitan statistical area.

With a large portion of its economy based on agriculture, Falls County is sixth among 254 Texas counties in corn production.

History

Native Americans

The Brazos River valley served as hunting grounds for several tribes, including Wacos, Tawakonis, and Anadarkos.  The Comanches were often a more aggressive band who forced other tribes off the land.  The Tawakoni branch of Wichita Indians originated north of Texas, but migrated south into East Texas. From 1843 onward, the Tawakoni were part of treaties made by both the Republic of Texas and the United States.

The Cherokees arrived in the early 1830s. Sam Houston, adopted son of Chief Oolooteka (John Jolly) of the Cherokee, negotiated the February 1836 treaty between Chief Bowl of the Cherokees and the Republic of Texas.

January 1839, Falls County had two brutal massacres by the Anadarkos, under chief José María, at the homes of George Morgan and John Marlin. A retaliatory offensive by settlers was ineffective, and forced the group into a retreat.

In 1846, several tribes negotiated a treaty with the United States government.

Settlers

Empresarios Sterling C. Robertson and Robert Leftwich received a grant from the Coahuila y Tejas legislature to settle 800 families.   By contracting how many families each grantee could settle, the government sought to have some control over colonization.  Robertson began bringing American settlers to his Nashville colony (later called Robertson's Colony).  Most of the settlers came from Alabama, Tennessee, and Mississippi. He named the capital of the Nashville colony Sarahville de Viesca.
Fort Viesca was built in 1834, with a name change to Fort Milam in 1835. The settlement was deserted during the Runaway Scrape of 1836, and reoccupied after the Battle of San Jacinto.

County established and growth

The state legislature formed Falls County from Limestone and Milam Counties in 1850, and named it after the falls of the Brazos River.  Marlin became the county seat.

By the census of 1860 the county had 1,716 slaves.  Falls County voted in favor of secession from the Union.  The county fared better during Reconstruction than most, perhaps due to its distance from areas subject to Union military occupation.

Marlin began to be known by the healing powers of its hot mineral waters by the 1890s. Conrad Hilton built the Falls Hotel, with a tunnel to a mineral bath, to accommodate the business generated by the hot spring.

The Houston and Texas Central Railway   became the first railroad through the county around 1870. The Waco Division of the San Antonio and Aransas Pass Railway, in 1886–1925, had multiple stops in Falls County. In 1902, the Missouri Pacific Railroad passed through the county.

A log cabin served as the county's first courthouse in the 1850s,  until the second courthouse was built of white cedar. The second courthouse burned in 1870. A third courthouse was built in 1876, but was damaged by a storm in 1886.

A fourth courthouse was built in 1888, which by the 1930s had greatly deteriorated.  The concrete, brick, and stone fifth and present-day courthouse, designed by architect Arthur E. Thomas, was completed in 1939.

Geography

Major highways
  Interstate 35 (two miles)
  U.S. Highway 77
  State Highway 6
  State Highway 7
  State Highway 14
  State Highway 53
  State Highway 320

Adjacent counties
 Limestone County (northeast)
 Robertson County (southeast)
 Milam County (south)
 Bell County (southwest)
 McLennan County (northwest)

Demographics

Note: the US Census treats Hispanic/Latino as an ethnic category. This table excludes Latinos from the racial categories and assigns them to a separate category. Hispanics/Latinos can be of any race.

As of the census of 2000, 18,576 people, 6,496 households, and 4,410 families resided in the county.  The population density was 24 people per square mile (9/km2).  The 7,658 housing units averaged  10 per square mile (4/km2).  The racial makeup of the county was 61.50% White, 27.45% Black or African American, 0.50% Native American, 0.11% Asian, 0.04% Pacific Islander, 8.81% from other races, and 1.59% from two or more races.  About 15.83% of the population was Hispanic or Latino of any race.

Of the 6,496 households, 30.60% had children under the age of 18 living with them, 48.20% were married couples living together, 15.60% had a female householder with no husband present, and 32.10% were not families. About 29.40% of all households was made up of individuals, and 15.40% had someone living alone who was 65 years of age or older.  The average household size was 2.54 and the average family size was 3.15.

In the county, the population was distributed as 27.60% under the age of 18, 7.80% from 18 to 24, 27.00% from 25 to 44, 20.80% from 45 to 64, and 16.90% who were 65 years of age or older.  The median age was 36 years. For every 100 females, there were 85.80 males.  For every 100 females age 18 and over, there were 74.40 males.

Males had a median income of $27,042 versus $20,128 for females. The per capita income for the county was $14,311. About 18.80% of families and 22.60% of the population were below the poverty line, including 28.70% of those under age 18 and 18.40% of those age 65 or over.

Government and infrastructure
The Texas Department of Criminal Justice (TDCJ) operates the Marlin Unit, a transfer facility for men, in the city of Marlin. The unit opened in June 1992 and was transferred to the Texas Youth Commission (TYC) in May 1995. When it was a part of TYC, the facility, then called the Marlin Orientation and Assessment Unit, served as the place of orientation for minors of both sexes being committed into the TYC's care, from the facility's opening in 1995 to its transfer out of TYC in 2007.

In September 2007, the facility was transferred back to the TDCJ. The TDCJ also operates the William P. Hobby Unit, a prison for women located southwest of Marlin in unincorporated Falls County.

Politics

Communities

Cities and towns
 Bruceville-Eddy (mostly in McLennan County)
 Golinda (small part in McLennan County)
 Lott
 Marlin (county seat)
 Rosebud

Census-designated place
 Chilton

Unincorporated communities

 Barclay
 Cedar Springs
 Cego
 Durango
 Highbank
 McClanahan
 Mooreville
 Perry
 Pleasant Grove
 Reagan
 Satin
 Stranger
 Tomlinson Hill
 Travis
 Westphalia
 Zipperlandville

In popular culture
Marlin has been a filming location for two movies: Leadbelly (1976) and Infamous (2006).

In 2013, a ranch in northeast Falls County near Mart, Texas, was the site of the series premiere of Treehouse Masters, in which a couple had a $200,000 treehouse built on their property.

See also

 National Register of Historic Places listings in Falls County, Texas
 Recorded Texas Historic Landmarks in Falls County

References

External links

 

 
1850 establishments in Texas
Populated places established in 1850